The Rowhouses at 256–274 Haven Street (also known as the Edward Manning Houses) are a series of historic rowhouses in Reading, Massachusetts, USA.  They were built in 1886 by Edward Manning on the site of a millyard that had been destroyed by fire a few years before.  The rowhouses are in a Greek Revival/Italianate style, unusual given that these styles had passed out of fashion by that time.  They are the only period rowhouses in Reading.

The rowhouses were listed on the National Register of Historic Places in 1984.

See also
National Register of Historic Places listings in Reading, Massachusetts
National Register of Historic Places listings in Middlesex County, Massachusetts

References

Buildings and structures in Reading, Massachusetts
Residential buildings on the National Register of Historic Places in Massachusetts
National Register of Historic Places in Reading, Massachusetts
1886 establishments in Massachusetts